German submarine U-1101 was a Type VIIC U-boat of Nazi Germany's Kriegsmarine during World War II.

She was ordered on 5 June 1941, and was laid down on 18 March 1943 at Nordseewerke, Emden, as yard number 223. She was launched on 13 September 1943 and commissioned under the command of Leutnant zur See Rudolf Dübler on 10 November 1943.

Design
German Type VIIC submarines were preceded by the shorter Type VIIB submarines. U-1101 had a displacement of  when at the surface and  while submerged. She had two shafts and two  propellers.

U-1101 was fitted with five  torpedo tubes (four fitted at the bow and one at the stern), fourteen torpedoes or 26 TMA mines, one  SK C/35 naval gun, (220 rounds), one  Flak M42 and two twin  C/30 anti-aircraft guns. The boat had a complement of between 44 — 52 men.

Service history
U-1101 was scuttled near Gelting in Gelting Bay on 5 May 1945 as part of Operation Regenbogen. Her wreck was raised and broken up.

References

Bibliography

External links

German Type VIIC submarines
U-boats commissioned in 1943
World War II submarines of Germany
Ships built in Emden
1943 ships
Operation Regenbogen (U-boat)